Song Eun-i (born January 4, 1973) is a South Korean singer, actress and comedian. She made her debut as a theater actress in 1993. In the same year, she made her debut as a comedian in KBS. She is currently signed under her own  management company Media Lab Seesaw (SISO). Currently, Song is running own company Media Lab Seesaw as CEO with her friend, Kim-Sook as director.

Education 
 Graduated Seoul Yangmok Elementary School
 Graduated Sinjeong Middle School
 Graduated 
 Graduated Seoul Institute of the Arts (Theatre College Degree Program)

Career 
Song first made her debut in the South Korean entertainment industry in 1993, as a KBS comedian.

In 2016, Song and fellow comedian Kim Sook published a book together, based on their podcast, Keeping Secrets. In the same year, Song became the CEO of CONTENTS LAB VIVO, a production company that creates internet-based content, as well as aiding Kim Jun-ho organise the Busan International Comedy Festival. Song's production company has produced multiple web-based shows and podcasts including Keeping Secrets, The King of Shopping and Kim Saeng-min's Receipt, as well as producing the group, Celeb Five, which Song is also a part of.

Personal life 
Song, among other South Korean celebrities such as Kim Won-hee and Kim Yong-man, is a part of a volunteer group called God is Love Ministry (GIL Ministry), who provide medical sponsorship for Haitian children with congenital heart disease, allowing the children to go to South Korea for medical treatment for their cardiovascular condition.

One of Song's hobbies includes woodworking, having learnt the skill with Kim Sook when she had little work and broadcasting activity.

Filmography

Films

Current programs

Former programs

Web shows

Radio shows

Hosting

Discography

Solo artist
Studio albums

Singles

Collaborative singles

Infinite Girls

Celeb Five

Awards and nominations

References

External links 

 Song Eun-i on Twitter
 Song Eun-i on Instagram

1973 births
Living people
FNC Entertainment artists
Seoul Institute of the Arts alumni
South Korean comedians
South Korean women comedians
South Korean television presenters
South Korean women television presenters
FNC Entertainment
Best Variety Performer Female Paeksang Arts Award (television) winners